A title is one or more words used before or after a person's name, in certain contexts.

Title or Titles  may also refer to:

Law
 Title (property), a claim or documents about legal ownership
 Short and long titles, the short formal name by which legislation is cited, and the full formal title appearing at the head of the legislation
One of the 53 divisions of the United States Code

Names and designations 
 Title (publishing), the name of a creative work
 Artwork title, the title of a piece of art
 Job title, a designation of a person's position in an organization
 Title of honor, a title bestowed as an award
 Honorary title (academic), a title bestowed in recognition of contribution outside of academic employment
 Hereditary title, a title that remains in a family
 Honorific, a title of esteem used for deference

Art and entertainment
 Title sequence, for opening credits in films
 Intertitle, title cards used in silent films
 Title (EP), a 2014 EP by Meghan Trainor
 Title (Meghan Trainor album), 2015 (a reissue of the EP, with additional songs)
 "Title" (song), a song by Meghan Trainor from the album of the same name
 Titles (album), a 1982 Mick Karn album
 The Title, a British rock band
 Title, a 2005 album by Straightener

Computing 
 Title (command), a command that changes the title of a terminal emulator window
 Title bar, decoration of a computer window
 , an HTML element

Other uses
 Title (animal), a competitive signifier on a domesticated animal
 Title (Christianity), the naming of the church first served by an Anglican deacon
 Championship, a high-level sports competition to determine a champion
 Stacy Title (1964–2021), American film director, screenwriter and producer

See also
 Subtitle (disambiguation)
 Address (disambiguation)
 Title case
 Tittle